Sir Trevor David Brooking,  (born 2 October 1948) is a former England international footballer, manager, pundit and football administrator; he now works as director of football development in England.

He spent almost his entire career at West Ham United, making 647 appearances for the club. He won the 1975 FA Cup and the 1980 FA Cup in which he scored the only goal. He was also the club's player of the season on four occasions and caretaker manager on two occasions in 2003. Brooking played 47 times for England, scoring five times. He was appointed a Member of the Order of the British Empire (MBE) in 1981, elevated to Commander of same order (CBE) in 1999, and knighted in 2004. In 2009, a stand at Upton Park was named after him. Since retiring from playing, he has taken up a number of positions in broadcasting as an on-air analyst and in football and sports administration.

Club career

West Ham United
Brooking was born in Barking maternity hospital to mother Margaret and father, Henry Charles (known as Harry), who was a police officer in the Metropolitan Police. Brooking attended Ripple Infants School and left Ilford County High School with 11 O-levels and 2 A-levels. His father took him to see his first West Ham United game at Upton Park, a 1–1 draw against Liverpool on 19 April 1958, when he was nine years old. Aged fifteen he trained at both Tottenham and Chelsea. However, West Ham manager Ron Greenwood watched him with scout Wally St Pier, and Brooking was offered apprenticeships by all three clubs, with only West Ham allowing him to stay on at school to finish his studies. Despite his parents being offered £500 and a car by manager Tommy Docherty to gain his signature for Chelsea he remained at school signing an apprenticeship deal with West Ham on 24 July 1965, his parents receiving no fee.

In June 1967, Brooking made his senior debut in a friendly for West Ham against Grasshopper Zürich in Switzerland. His league debut came in place of wide-right Brian Dear on 29 August 1967 in a 3–3 draw with Burnley at Turf Moor. His first goal came on 26 December 1967 in a 4–2 away win at Leicester City. His first season saw him play 28 games, scoring nine goals. His second season saw 37 appearances and eight goals. His only hat-trick came on 6 April 1968 in a 5–0 home defeat of Newcastle. In December 1969, during his third season, Brooking chipped a bone in his ankle in a game against Nottingham Forest. The club signed Peter Eustace for £90,000 to take his place; his recovery took longer than expected, and he considered giving up the game. However, he returned to playing and with the departure of Martin Peters to Tottenham in March 1970, Brooking became a regular in midfield. His place in the side came under threat in the 1971–72 season with the purchase of midfielder Tommy Taylor, and Brooking was transfer-listed at his own request. However, the failure of the defensive partnership between Bobby Moore and Alan Stephenson saw Stephenson dropped and Taylor being moved into defence; Brooking remained an ever-present for the rest of the season and was voted Hammer of the Year. During the 1972–73 season he came to the attention of Derby County manager Brian Clough, who offered West Ham £400,000 for Brooking and Moore, but Greenwood refused to let the pair leave. Again, in 1974 Tottenham manager Bill Nicholson offered £425,000 for the signature of Brooking. According to Brooking in his autobiography, this move was not pursued as he felt Nicholson, a manager he admired, was coming to the end of his Tottenham career and he was unsure of which manager would follow him.

He won the FA Cup twice, in 1975 with Brooking scoring a vital goal in a 2–1 win in a fourth round replay away at Swindon Town and 1980; in the latter, he scored another vital goal in a 2–1 win in a third round replay against West Bromwich Albion and the only goal in a 1–0 win over Arsenal in the final with a header. Brooking was a member of the West Ham team which won the Second Division in 1981. He also appeared in the 1975 FA Charity Shield, the 1976 European Cup Winners' Cup Final, the 1980 FA Charity Shield and the 1981 Football League Cup Final. His last game for West Ham came on 18 May 1984 in 1–0 home defeat by Everton. In total he made 647 appearances and scoring 102 times, wearing the number 10 jersey, his total appearances for West Ham beaten only by Billy Bonds, Bobby Moore and Frank Lampard Sr. He had a testimonial match against an England XI in October 1977.

Later career
During the 1984 New Zealand National Soccer League season, Brooking made a single appearance for Manurewa, playing in a 2–2 draw against Auckland University.

Brooking accepted an invitation to play for Blue Star in a Wearside League game against Coundon on 28 April 1985. Blue Star had paid for him to fly to Newcastle as their guest and reportedly paid him an appearance fee of £500.

In 1985, Brooking played six times for Western Australian club Kelmscott, also helping to coach the club's youth sides.

Later that year, Brooking played briefly for Cork City, making two appearances.

International career
Brooking made his England debut on 3 April 1974 in a 0–0 draw against Portugal. He played 47 times, scoring five goals but only appeared twice in major tournaments. At Euro 1980 in Italy he played in England's opening game against Belgium which was a 1–1 draw, but was dropped for the second game, against Italy which England lost 1–0. Re-instated to the starting eleven against Spain he scored England's first goal in a 2–1 win. Due to injury World Cup 1982 was to see him limited to playing as a substitute against Spain on 5 July 1982. Playing for only the last half-hour of the game, Brooking forced one excellent save from the Spanish goalkeeper, Luis Arconada, but with England needing to win to qualify for the semi-final a 0–0 draw saw them eliminated. This was to be his final international appearance.

Style of play
Brooking was primarily right-footed, but was comfortable on his left foot, due to repeated practice. He played as an attacking midfield player, known for his controlled passing and midfield authority. Early in his career he was vulnerable to being out-muscled by opposition players (leading his teammates to nickname him 'Cyril' after Cyril Lord the carpet salesman, as Ron Greenwood told him "you're always on the floor"). He lacked pace, leading to another nickname, Boog, after a slow baseball player called Boog Powell the team had witnessed during a tour of the US. He was rarely booked or sent off during his West Ham career and due to his gentlemanly approach to the game where he rarely contested a referee's decision he picked up another nickname, Hadleigh, after a television upper class and urbane detective played by Gerald Harper.

Managerial career
In April 2003, after West Ham manager Glenn Roeder collapsed due to a brain tumour, Brooking, having long been on the board at West Ham, briefly took over as caretaker manager. The club were fighting relegation from the Premier League. Brooking took charge of three games. His first game resulted in a 1–0 win at Manchester City with a goal from Frédéric Kanouté. His second saw West Ham beat Chelsea 1–0, thanks to a goal from Paolo Di Canio. The final game of the season saw West Ham draw 2–2 at Birmingham City resulting in relegation, albeit with 42 points, a record number for a relegated team in a 38-game season. After the first three games of the 2003–04 season with West Ham now in the First Division, Roeder was sacked after West Ham suffered an away defeat to Rotherham United and Brooking was again installed as caretaker manager. He managed for eleven games, losing only once, to Gillingham, a 2–0 away defeat in which Jermain Defoe was sent off. In October 2003 he was replaced by Alan Pardew, who was appointed on his recommendation.

Media career
In 1984, Brooking joined the BBC as a pundit, and has featured on radio and television commentary since, including the BBC's Match of the Day and coverage of World Cups and European Championships. He was also the co-commentator in the Pro Evolution Soccer video game series, alongside Peter Brackley until Pro Evolution Soccer 6.

Football administration
Brooking was chair of the Eastern Region Council for Sport and Recreation from 1987 until 1997, and between 1999 and 2002 he was chairman of Sport England. In January 2004, he joined the Football Association as Director of Football Development, a role which gave him control of coaching and development in English football, as well as a role in appointing future England managers.

He was a key part of the selection process for the successor of Sven-Göran Eriksson, revealed in May 2006 to be Steve McClaren. In 2004, he was knighted for his services to sport.

Personal life
In June 1970, he married Hilkka, a Finnish au pair. The couple have two children: Collette and Warren.

In 1970, along with schoolfriend Colin McGowan, Brooking started a book binding company, Colbrook Plastics Limited in Stratford, East London. He was awarded an honorary doctorate from the University of Essex in 2001. In October 2014, his autobiography, Trevor Brooking, My Life in Football, was published.

Career statistics

Club

International

Scores and results list England's goal tally first, score column indicates score after each Brooking goal.

Managerial

Honours
Brooking was appointed as Member of the Order of the British Empire (MBE) in 1981, elevated to Commander of same Order (CBE) in 1999, and knighted in 2004.

In November 2015, Brooking was awarded 'Global Football Ambassador' at the 4th annual Football Business Awards.

FA Cup: 1975, 1980
UEFA Cup Winners' Cup runner-up: 1976
Football League Cup runner-up: 1981
Football League Second Division: 1980–81

Sir Trevor Brooking Stand

In 2009 West Ham United announced that from 8 August, the start of the 2009/10 Premier League Season, 'The Centenary Stand' at Upton Park would be named 'The Sir Trevor Brooking Stand' in his honour. The stand was used by away supporters and had been the scene for crowd disturbances. In 2009 in a match between West Ham and Millwall seats were torn out by Millwall fans and hurled towards West Ham fans. In subsequent seasons, Millwall fans were segregated to the upper tier of the stand and kept at least 30 yards from West Ham fans to prevent crowd disturbances. A stand at the Olympic Stadium is also named after Brooking and used by West Ham after their move from the Boleyn Ground from the start of the 2016–17 season.

References
Specific

General

External links

1948 births
Living people
Footballers from Barking, London
People educated at Ilford County High School
English footballers
England under-23 international footballers
England international footballers
West Ham United F.C. players
English expatriate footballers
Cork City F.C. players
English Football League players
English Football League representative players
League of Ireland players
UEFA Euro 1980 players
1982 FIFA World Cup players
English football managers
West Ham United F.C. managers
Premier League managers
English Football League managers
English association football commentators
English Football Hall of Fame inductees
Association football people awarded knighthoods
Knights Bachelor
Commanders of the Order of the British Empire
People associated with the University of Essex
English autobiographers
Newcastle Blue Star F.C. players
Association football midfielders
Expatriate association footballers in the Republic of Ireland
FA Cup Final players
English expatriate sportspeople in New Zealand
Expatriate association footballers in New Zealand
English expatriate sportspeople in Australia
Expatriate soccer players in Australia
Association football coaches
Manurewa AFC players
Footballers from Essex